The 2009 season was the Indianapolis Colts' 57th in the National Football League (NFL) and their 26th in Indianapolis. It was the first season since 2001 that the Colts did not have Tony Dungy on their coaching staff, due to his retirement from coaching. The 2009 Indianapolis Colts improved upon their 12–4 record from 2008 as well as winning their sixth AFC South division championship in seven years with a 14–2 record. The Colts also clinched the top seed in the AFC. The Colts were the sole undefeated team after Week 15. The following week, the Colts lost to the New York Jets after benching their starters. During the playoffs, the Colts defeated the Baltimore Ravens in the divisional round and the New York Jets in the AFC Championship game and represented the AFC in Super Bowl XLIV. The 14–2 Colts lost to the 13–3 New Orleans Saints in Super Bowl XLIV, 31–17.

Offseason

Head coach announcement
On January 12, 2009, Head coach Tony Dungy announced his retirement from coaching in the National Football League. Two days later, then-Assistant Head Coach and Quarterbacks Coach Jim Caldwell was formally announced as Dungy's successor.

Staff changes
 Clyde Christensen replaced Jim Caldwell as Assistant Head Coach.
 Larry Coyer replaced Ron Meeks as Defensive Coordinator (Meeks resigned).
 Tom Moore originally decided to retire from coaching in the National Football League due to a revision in the league's pension plan for non-players. Almost four months later, he was re-hired by the Colts as their Senior Offensive Coordinator.
 Howard Mudd originally decided to retire from coaching in the National Football League due to a revision in the league's pension plan for non-players. Almost four months later, he was re-hired by the Colts as their Senior Offensive Line Coach.
 Frank Reich replaced Jim Caldwell as Quarterbacks coach.
 Ray Rychleski replaced Russ Purnell as Special Teams coach.

Additions

Departures

Free agents

2009 NFL draft

Undrafted free agents

Staff

Roster

Depth chart

Schedule

Preseason

Regular season

Standings

Game summaries

Week 1: vs. Jacksonville Jaguars

With the win the Colts started out the season 1–0 and improved their regular season winning streak to 9 games.

Week 2: at Miami Dolphins

With the win, not only did the Colts improve to 2–0, but Peyton Manning's 119th career victory would surpass Johnny Unitas for the most quarterback wins in franchise history.  The win also helped the Colts' improved their winning streak to 10 games in the regular season. The Colts' offense would make the most of its time on the field, as they were only in the game for 14:53.

Week 3: at Arizona Cardinals

With the win the Colts improved to 3–0 and their regular season winning streak to 11 games.

Week 4: vs. Seattle Seahawks

With the win, the Colts improved to 4–0 and made their record 12 straight regular season games. Colts QB Peyton Manning would tie Fran Tarkenton for the third–most career touchdown passes in NFL history (342), behind only Brett Favre and Dan Marino. Also, Colts head coach Jim Caldwell would become the franchise's first rookie head coach since Lindy Infante in 1996 to win their first four games.

Week 5: at Tennessee Titans

With the win the Colts improved to 5–0 into their bye week and increased their winning streak to 13 games.

Week 7: at St. Louis Rams

at Edward Jones Dome, St. Louis, Missouri
 Game time: 1:00 PM EDT
 Game weather: None (Domed Stadium)
 Game attendance: 60,108
 Referee: Carl Cheffers
 TV announcers (CBS): Kevin Harlan and Solomon Wilcots

Coming off their bye week, the Colts flew to the Edward Jones Dome for a Week 7 interconference duel with the St. Louis Rams.  Indianapolis came out of the gates early in the first quarter as quarterback Peyton Manning completed a six-yard touchdown pass to wide receiver Reggie Wayne.  The Rams would respond with a 30-yard field goal from kicker Josh Brown, yet the Colts answered with Manning hooking up with tight end Dallas Clark on a 22-yard touchdown pass.  Afterwards, running back Joseph Addai would acquire the only score of the second quarter with a six-yard touchdown.

St. Louis would begin the third quarter with Brown booting a 45-yard field goal, yet Indianapolis calmly responded with rookie cornerback Jacob Lacey returning an interception 35 yards for a touchdown.  Afterwards, the Colts closed out the game with Manning finding rookie wide receiver Austin Collie on an eight-yard touchdown pass and running back Chad Simpson getting a 31-yard touchdown run.

With the win, Indianapolis improved to 6–0 and increased their winning streak to 14 games.

Scoring
First quarter
IND – Reggie Wayne six-yard pass from Peyton Manning, 8:50 (Matt Stover kick), Colts 7–0. Drive: 12 plays, 90 yards, 6:10.
STL – Josh Brown 30-yard field goal, 5:26. Colts 7–3. Drive: 8 plays, 69 yards, 3:24.
IND – Dallas Clark 27-yard pass from Peyton Manning, 3:31 (Stover kick), Colts 14–3. Drive: 3 plays, 78 yards, 1:55.
Second quarter
IND – Joseph Addai six-yard run (Stover kick), 1:57, Colts 21–3. Drive: 8 plays, 41 yards, 3:42.
Third quarter
STL – Josh Brown 45-yard field goal, 5:07. Colts 21–6. Drive: 7 plays, 33 yards, 3:56.
IND – Jacob Lacey 35-yard interception return (Stover kick), 1:00. Colts 28–6.
Fourth quarter
IND – Austin Collie eight-yard pass from Peyton Manning, 3:42 (Stover kick), Colts 35–6. Drive: 11 plays, 93 yards, 6:47.
IND – Chad Simpson 35-yard run, 2:29 (Stover kick), Colts 42–6. Drive: 1 play, 31 yards, 0:08.

Week 8: vs. San Francisco 49ers

at Lucas Oil Stadium, Indianapolis
 Game time: 1:00 PM EST
 Game weather: 49 °F (Sunny)
 Game attendance: 66,229
 Referee: Ed Hochuli
 TV announcers (Fox): Sam Rosen, Tim Ryan, and Laura Okmin

The Colts began three straight home games in Week 8 with an interconference duel against the San Francisco 49ers.  Indianapolis would find themselves trailing in the first quarter as 49ers running back Frank Gore got a 64-yard touchdown run.  The Colts answered with kicker Matt Stover getting a 38-yard field goal.  In the second quarter, Indianapolis crept closer as Stover made a 33-yard field goal, yet San Francisco answered with quarterback Alex Smith completing an eight-yard touchdown pass to tight end Vernon Davis.  The Colts closed out the half with a 31-yard field goal from Stover.

In the second half, Indianapolis narrowed San Francisco's lead to two as Stover booted a 40-yard field goal. In the fourth quarter, they executed a halfback option play as running back Joseph Addai's threw a 22-yard touchdown pass to wide receiver Reggie Wayne. Afterwards, the defense held off against the various comeback attempts from the 49ers.

With the win, the Colts improved to 7–0 for the fourth time in five seasons and they set a franchise record with 15 consecutive regular season wins.

Also, quarterback Peyton Manning (31/48 for 347 yards) joined Dan Marino, Brett Favre, and John Elway as the only players in NFL history to complete 4,000 career passes.  In addition, he became the fastest to reach the milestone as he reached it in 183 games.

Scoring
First quarter
SF – Frank Gore 64-yard run (Joe Nedney kick), 11:16, 49ers 7–0. Drive: 2 plays, 70 yards, 0:46.
IND – Matt Stover 38-yard field goal, 3:16. 49ers 7–3. Drive: 10 plays, 57 yards, 4:40.
Second quarter
IND – Matt Stover 33-yard field goal, 14:50. 49ers 7–6. Drive: 5 plays, 19 yards, 1:17.
SF – Vernon Davis 8-yard pass from Alex Smith, 0:38 (Nedney kick), 49ers 14–6. Drive: 7 plays, 74 yards, 1:19.
IND – Matt Stover 31-yard field goal, 0:06, 49ers 14–9. Drive: 3 plays, 48 yards, 0:32.
Third quarter
IND – Matt Stover 40-yard field goal, 9:34, 49ers 14–12. Drive: 11 plays, 52 yards, 5:26.
Fourth quarter
IND – Reggie Wayne 22-yard pass from Joseph Addai, 14:53 (two-point conversion failed), Colts 18–14. Drive: 9 plays, 70 yards, 3:10.

Week 9: vs. Houston Texans

at Lucas Oil Stadium, Indianapolis
 Game time: 1:00 PM EST
 Game weather: 69 °F (Sunny)
 Game attendance: 66,033
 Referee: Jeff Triplette
 TV announcers (CBS): Kevin Harlan & Solomon Wilcots

Coming off their win over the 49ers, the Colts stayed at home for a Week 9 AFC South duel with the Houston Texans.  Indianapolis would get off to a fast start in the first quarter as quarterback Peyton Manning completed a seven-yard touchdown pass to running back Joseph Addai, followed by kicker Matt Stover nailing a 22-yard field goal.  The Colts would add onto their lead in the second quarter as Stover booted a 37-yard field goal, while the Texans would close out the half with a 56-yard field goal from kicker Kris Brown.

In the third quarter, Houston began to rally as quarterback Matt Schaub found running back Ryan Moats on a one-yard touchdown pass.  The Texans would take the lead in the fourth quarter with a one-yard touchdown run from running back Steve Slaton, yet Indianapolis regained the lead with Addai's two-yard touchdown run. The Texans attempted to force the game into overtime with a 42-yard field goal attempt, which went wide left.

With the win, the Colts improved to 8–0 for the third time in five seasons as well as increasing their winning streak to 16 games.

Peyton Manning (34/50 for 318 yards, 1 TD, 1 INT) would become the first quarterback in NFL history to throw for 40,000 yards in one decade.

Jim Caldwell would become the first rookie head coach to start 8–0 since Potsy Clark in 1931.

Scoring
First quarter
IND – Joseph Addai 7-yard pass from Peyton Manning, 6:20 (Matt Stover kick), Colts 7–0. Drive: 12 plays, 79 yards, 4:39.
IND – Matt Stover 22-yard field goal, 3:58, Colts 10–0. Drive: 6 plays, 41 yards, 2:06.
Second quarter
IND – Matt Stover 37-yard field goal, 12:50, Colts 13–0. Drive: 10 plays, 61 yards, 3:51.
HOU – Kris Brown 56-yard field goal, 0:01, Colts 13–3. Drive: 5 plays, 12 yards, 0:56.
Third quarter
HOU – Ryan Moats 1-yard pass from Matt Schaub, 8:31 (Kris Brown kick), Colts 13–10. Drive: 12 plays, 86 yards, 6:29.
Fourth quarter
HOU – Steve Slaton 1-yard run, 14:58 (Kris Brown kick), Texans 17–13. Drive: 12 plays, 84 yards, 6:41.
IND – Joseph Addai 2-yard run, 7:11 (Matt Stover kick), Colts 20–17. Drive: 8 plays, 61 yards, 3:49.

Week 10: vs. New England Patriots

at Lucas Oil Stadium, Indianapolis
 Game time: 8:20 PM EST
 Game weather: Played with roof closed, retractable roof stadium
 Game attendance: 67,476
 Referee: Scott Green
 TV announcers (NBC): Al Michaels, Cris Collinsworth, and Andrea Kremer

The Indianapolis Colts and New England Patriots set up for their rivalry game at Lucas Oil Stadium.  The Colts came in at 8–0 while the Patriots came in 6–2, both shooting for home field advantage during the playoffs.  The Colts struck first with a 15-yard touchdown pass from Manning to Addai.  However New England answered with 24 unanswered points in the first and second quarter.  The Colts finally got back into the game with a 20-yard touchdown pass to Reggie Wayne towards the end of the first half.  The third quarter was scoreless with the Colts still trailing by 10, but the Patriots started the fourth with a touchdown pass to Randy Moss with the Patriots now leading 31–14.  The Colts came back quickly scoring a touchdown, making it 31–21.  After a New England field goal, the Colts scored a touchdown on an Addai run.  The Patriots were still in the lead 34–28, however the Colts were hot with Peyton Manning ready to lead them to a win if the defense could hold the Patriot offense for one more drive.  With less the two and a half minutes remaining in the game, the New England Patriots were faced with a fourth and two on their own 28-yard line.  Bill Belichick decided to go for it on a controversial play, where Brady threw to Kevin Faulk, who gained control of the ball behind the first down marker, forcing the Patriots to turn the ball over on downs. Having wasted their last time out on the preceding play and the play occurring before the two-minute warning, the Patriots couldn't challenge the ruling on the field. With a minute left Peyton Manning found Reggie Wayne for the touchdown to seal a 35–34 victory over the Patriots as the team improved to 9–0 and their winning streak continued with 17 games.

Scoring
First quarter
IND – Joseph Addai 15-yard pass from Peyton Manning, 8:19 (Matt Stover kick), Colts 7–0. Drive: 8 plays, 90 yards, 3:28.
NE – Laurence Maroney 1-yard run, 4:47 (Stephen Gostkowski kick), Tied 7–7. Drive: 6 plays, 73 yards, 3:32.
Second quarter
NE – Stephen Gostkowski 31-yard field goal, 13:15, Patriots 10–7. Drive: 11 plays, 58 yards, 4:52.
NE – Randy Moss 63-yard pass from Tom Brady, 11:18 (Gostkowski kick), Patriots 17–7. Drive: 2 plays, 75 yards, 0:51.
NE – Julian Edelman 9-yard pass from Tom Brady, 7:19, (Gostkowski kick) Patriots 24–7. Drive: 5 plays, 57 yards, 2:12.
IND – Reggie Wayne 20-yard pass from Peyton Manning, 4:17 (Stover kick), Patriots 24–14. Drive: 8 plays, 80 yards, 3:02.
Fourth quarter
NE – Randy Moss five-yard pass from Tom Brady, 14:18 (Gostkowski kick), Patriots 31–14. Drive: 2 plays, 7 yards, 0:42.
IND – Pierre Garçon 29-yard pass from Peyton Manning, 12:14 (Stover kick), Patriots 31–21. Drive: 5 plays, 79 yards, 2:04.
NE – Stephen Gostkowski 36-yard field goal, 4:12, Patriots 34–21. Drive: 7 plays, 13 yards, 3:32.
IND – Joseph Addai four-yard run, 2:23 (Stover kick), Patriots 34–28. Drive: 6 plays, 79 yards, 1:49.
IND – Reggie Wayne 1-yard pass from Peyton Manning, 0:13 (Stover kick), Colts 35–34. Drive: 4 plays, 29 yards, 1:47.

Week 11: at Baltimore Ravens

at M&T Bank Stadium, Baltimore
 Game time: 1:00 PM EST
 Game weather: 56 °F (Sunny)
 Game attendance: 71,320
 Referee: John Parry
 TV announcers (CBS): Greg Gumbel & Dan Dierdorf

Following their comeback win over the Patriots, the Colts flew to M&T Bank Stadium for a Week 11 duel with the Baltimore Ravens.  In the first quarter, Indianapolis got on the board first with quarterback Peyton Manning passing to tight end Dallas Clark for a three-yard touchdown.  Baltimore would respond as kicker Billy Cundiff made a 46-yard and a 44-yard field goal. In the second quarter, the Ravens took the lead with Cundiff nailing a 38-yard field goal, until the Colts came right back when running back Joseph Addai's five-yard touchdown run. The Ravens would close out the half with Cundiff booting a 36-yard field goal.

After a scoreless third quarter, Cundiff's 20-yard field goal gave the Ravens the lead again in the fourth quarter.  Fortunately, Indianapolis would regain the lead again as former Baltimore kicker Matt Stover booted a 20-yard field goal.

With the win, the Colts would improve to 10–0, which includes a franchise-best nine-straight road win dating back to last season well as 18 straight wins overall.

Dallas Clark (1 reception for 3 yards and 1 TD) would break John Mackey's record for the most receptions by a Colts tight end with 321.

Scoring
First quarter
IND – Dallas Clark 3-yard pass from Peyton Manning, 11:24 (Matt Stover kick), Colts 7–0. Drive: 7 plays, 87 yards, 3:36.
BAL – Billy Cundiff 46-yard field goal, 5:41, Colts 7–3. Drive: 15 plays, 51 yards, 6:15.
BAL – Billy Cundiff 44-yard field goal, 4:06, Colts 7–6. Drive: 4 plays, 3 yards, 0:52.
Second quarter
BAL – Billy Cundiff 38-yard field goal, 4:48, Ravens 9–7. Drive: 8 plays, 32 yards, 3:50.
IND – Joseph Addai 5-yard run, 1:28 (Stover kick), Colts 14–9. Drive: 8 plays, 80 yards, 3:15.
BAL – Billy Cundiff 36-yard field goal, 0:07, Colts 14–12. Drive: 9 plays, 54 yards, 1:21.
Fourth quarter
BAL – Billy Cundiff 20-yard field goal, 10:16, Ravens 15–14. Drive: 15 plays, 65 yards, 8:05.
IND – Matt Stover 25-yard field goal, 7:06, Colts 17–15. Drive: 9 plays, 66 yards, 2:58.

Week 12: at Houston Texans

at Reliant Stadium, Houston
 Game time: 1:00 PM EST
 Game weather: 75 °F (Mostly Cloudy)
 Game attendance: 70,990
 Referee: Al Riveron
 TV announcers (CBS): Greg Gumbel & Dan Dierdorf

Coming off their road win against the Ravens, the Colts flew to Reliant Stadium for an AFC South showdown with the Texans, their second meeting of the season. Houston dominated throughout the first half, scoring 17 points. The Colts took over from there, scoring 35 points, one of which was an interception returned 27 yards by Clint Session.

With the win, the Colts went to 11–0and their winning streak improved to 19 games.

Also, with the win and Jacksonville's loss to San Francisco, the Colts clinched the AFC South division title, the first team to clinch a playoff berth this season.
Scoring
First quarter
HOU – Vonta Leach 7-yard pass from Matt Schaub, 8:31 (Kris Brown kick), Texans 7–0. Drive: 11 plays, 79 yards, 6:35.
HOU – Chris Brown 5-yard run, 2:10 (Brown kick), Texans 14–0. Drive: 7 plays, 66 yards, 3:46.
Second quarter
HOU – Kris Brown 35-yard field goal, 10:49. Texans 17–0. Drive: 7 plays, 12 yards, 2:41.
IND – Pierre Garçon 9-yard pass from Peyton Manning, 5:46 (Matt Stover kick), Texans 17–7. Drive: 8 plays, 74 yards, 5:03.
HOU – Kris Brown 33-yard field goal, 1:00. Texans 20–7. Drive: 11 plays, 65 yards, 4:46.
Third quarter
IND – Reggie Wayne 4-yard pass from Peyton Manning, 11:20 (Stover kick), Texans 20–14. Drive: 9 plays, 80 yards, 3:40.
Fourth quarter
IND – Dallas Clark 6-yard pass from Peyton Manning, 8:24 (Stover kick), Colts 21–20. Drive: 7 plays, 89 yards, 2:50.
IND – Clint Session 27-yard interception return, 8:09 (Stover kick), Colts 28–20.
IND – Chad Simpson 23-yard run, 2:52 (Stover kick), Colts 35–20. Drive: 4 plays, 37 yards, 1:43.
HOU – Jacoby Jones 10-yard pass from Matt Schaub, 0:18 (Stover kick), Colts 35–27. Drive:  12 plays, 75 yards, 2:34.

Week 13: vs. Tennessee Titans

at Lucas Oil Stadium, Indianapolis
 Game time: 1:00 PM EST
 Game weather: None (Retractable Roof Closed)
 Game attendance: 66,321
 Referee: Ron Winter
 TV announcers (CBS): Ian Eagle & Rich Gannon
Coming off their come-from-behind road win against Houston, the Colts went home for a divisional duel with the 5–6 Tennessee Titans. Indianapolis started off the scoring with an eight-yard run from Joseph Addai. The Titans came back with a 20-yard field goal by Rob Bironas. Indianapolis struck again in the second quarter on another Joseph Addai run, then again on a four-yard pass to Austin Collie. The Titans would hit paydirt next with 0:20 left in the half, but Indianapolis would close out the first half with a 43-yard field goal by Matt Stover. After a scoreless third quarter, the Colts would strike next on another field goal, this time from 36 yards. The Titans scored again on a 17-yard pass to Bo Scaife. The Titans regained possession on an onside kick, but the Colts Defense kept the Titans from scoring again.

With the win, the Colts went to 12–0

Also with the win, the Colts tied the 2006–2008 Patriots record for most consecutive regular season wins with 21.

Scoring
First quarter
IND – Joseph Addai 8-yard run, 13:02 (Matt Stover kick), Colts 7–0. Drive: 5 plays, 75 yards, 1:58.
TEN – Rob Bironas 20-yard field goal, 6:34. Colts 7–3. Drive: 13 plays, 69 yards, 6:28.
Second quarter
IND – Joseph Addai 1-yard run, 11:42 (Stover kick), Colts 14–3. Drive: 10 plays, 77 yards, 3:56.
IND – Austin Collie 4-yard pass from Peyton Manning, 1:55 (Stover kick), Colts 21–3. Drive: 9 plays, 42 yards, 3:48.
TEN – Kenny Britt 6-yard pass from Vince Young, 0:20 (Bironas kick), Colts 21–10. Drive: 8 plays, 66 yards, 1:35.
IND – Matt Stover 43-yard field goal, 0:00, Colts 24–10. Drive: 4 plays, 38 yards, 0:20.
Third quarter
No scoring play
Fourth quarter
IND – Matt Stover 36-yard field goal, 3:14, Colts 27–10. Drive: 15 plays, 69 yards, 7:23.
TEN – Bo Scaife 17-yard pass from Vince Young, 1:23 (Bironas kick), Colts 27–17. Drive: 6 plays, 46 yards, 1:51.

Week 14: vs. Denver Broncos

at Lucas Oil Stadium, Indianapolis
 Game time: 1:00 PM EST
 Game weather: None (retractable roof closed)
 Game attendance: 67,248
 Referee: Bill Leavy
 TV announcers (CBS): Dick Enberg & Dan Fouts

The Colts improved their season record to 13–0 and broke the 2006–2008 Patriots record for most consecutive regular season wins with 22.

Scoring
First quarter
IND – Austin Collie 5-yard pass from Peyton Manning, 9:06 (Matt Stover kick), Colts 7–0. Drive: 13 plays, 80 yards, 5:54.
IND – Dallas Clark 10-yard pass from Peyton Manning, 5:04 (Stover kick), Colts 14–0. Drive: 7 plays, 56 yards, 2:24.
Second quarter
IND – Dallas Clark 1-yard pass from Peyton Manning, 7:58 (Stover kick), Colts 21–0. Drive: 11 plays, 71 yards, 5:03.
DEN – Brandon Marshall 5-yard pass from Kyle Orton, 2:23 (Matt Prater kick), Colts 21–7. Drive: 12 plays, 80 yards, 5:35.
Third quarter
No scoring play
Fourth quarter
DEN – Matt Prater 28-yard field goal, 14:50, Colts 21–10. Drive: 5 plays, 14 yards, 1:02.
DEN – Brandon Marshall 5-yard pass from Kyle Orton, 9:44 (two-point conversion failed), Colts 21–16. Drive: 11 plays, 68 yards, 4:44.
IND – Dallas Clark 1-yard pass from Peyton Manning, 2:25 (Stover kick), Colts 28–16. Drive: 14 plays, 80 yards, 7:19.

Week 15: at Jacksonville Jaguars

at Jacksonville Municipal Stadium, Jacksonville, Florida
 Game time: 8:20 PM EST
 Game weather: 61 °F (Mostly cloudy)
 Game attendance: 63,753
 Referee: Walt Anderson
 TV announcers (NFLN): Bob Papa & Matt Millen
Scoring
First quarter
JAC – Josh Scobee 50-yard field goal, 7:32, Jaguars 3–0. Drive: 13 plays, 41 yards, 7:33.
Second quarter
IND – Dallas Clark 6-yard pass from Peyton Manning, 14:19 (Matt Stover kick), Colts 7–3. Drive: 14 plays, 80 yards, 8:14.
JAC – Maurice Jones-Drew 9-yard pass from David Garrard, 8:34 (Scobee kick), Jaguars 10–7. Drive: 11 plays, 61 yards, 5:48.
IND – Chad Simpson 93-yard kickoff return, 8:25 (Stover kick), Colts 14–10.
JAC – Maurice Jones-Drew 3-yard run, 3:05 (Scobee kick), Jaguars 17–14. Drive: 10 plays, 71 yards, 5:14.
IND – Austin Collie 23-yard pass from Peyton Manning, 0:40 (Stover kick), Colts 21–17. Drive: 6 plays, 68 yards, 2:23.
Third quarter
JAC – Mike Sims-Walker 16-yard pass from David Garrard, 8:37 (Scobee kick), Jaguars 24–21. Drive: 9 plays, 39 yards, 3:45.
IND – Dallas Clark 27-yard pass from Peyton Manning, 5:37 (Stover kick), Colts 28–24. Drive: 7 plays, 80 yards, 3:04.
JAC – Mike Thomas 13-yard pass from David Garrard, 0:53 (Scobee kick), Jaguars 28–31. Drive: 9 plays, 46 yards, 4:41.
Fourth quarter
IND – Reggie Wayne 65-yard pass from Peyton Manning, 5:23 (Stover kick), Colts 35–31. Drive: 1 play, 65 yards, 8:37.

With the win the Colts improved to 14–0 and their winning streak improved to 23.  Also, with the Saints' loss the Colts became the NFL's only undefeated team.

The Colts also became the first team since the 2007 Patriots to start a season at 14–0.

Week 16: vs. New York Jets

at Lucas Oil Stadium, Indianapolis
 Game time: 4:15 PM EST
 Game weather: None (retractable roof closed)
 Game attendance:
 Referee: Terry McAulay
 TV announcers (CBS): Greg Gumbel and Dan Dierdorf

With this loss, the Colts ended their perfect season run and had a record of 14–1 heading into the last week of the regular season. The Colts also ended their 23–game regular season winning streak.

Scoring
First quarter
IND – Joseph Addai 21-yard run, 6:55 (Adam Vinatieri kick blocked), Colts 6–0. Drive: 8 plays, 54 yards, 4:20.
Second quarter
IND – Adam Vinatieri 22-yard field goal, 11:46. Colts 9–0. Drive: 10 plays, 86 yards, 4:45.
NYJ – Jay Feely 35-yard field goal, 1:44. Colts 9–3. Drive: 11 plays, 63 yards, 4:38.
Third quarter
NYJ – Brad Smith 106-yard kickoff return, 0:12 (Feely kick), Jets 10–9.
IND – Donald Brown 1-yard run, 10:13 (two-point conversion failed), Colts 15–10. Drive: 9 plays, 81 yards, 4:35.
NYJ – Marques Douglas 1-yard fumble return, 1:29 (Dustin Keller two-point conversion), Jets 18–15.
Fourth quarter
NYJ – Jay Feely 43-yard field goal, 13:34. Jets 21–15. Drive: 6 plays, 20 yards, 2:03
NYJ – Thomas Jones 1-yard run, 5:38 (Braylon Edwards two-point conversion), Jets 29–15. Drive: 11 plays, 79 yards, 6:14

Week 17: at Buffalo Bills

With the loss, the Colts finished the season with a league-best 14-2
.

Postseason

AFC Divisional vs. Baltimore Ravens

Entering the postseason as the AFC's #1 seed, the Colts began their playoff run at home in the AFC Divisional Round against the #6 Baltimore Ravens.  Indianapolis would open the first quarter with a 44-yard field goal from former Ravens kicker Matt Stover.  Baltimore would reply with a 25-yard field goal from kicker Billy Cundiff.  In the second quarter, the Colts would deliver a big punch as quarterback Peyton Manning hooked up with rookie wide receiver Austin Collie on a 10-yard touchdown pass and then found wide receiver Reggie Wayne on a three-yard touchdown pass.  After a scoreless third quarter, Indianapolis would add onto their lead with Stover's 33-yard field goal.  From there, the defense kept forcing turnovers to prevail. Manning ended up yelling at Donald Brown during a play at the beginning of the fourth quarter, which became a meme.

AFC Championship vs. New York Jets

Coming off their divisional win over the Ravens, the Colts would stay at home for the AFC Championship Game against the #5 New York Jets. After a scoreless first quarter, Indianapolis would begin the second quarter with a 25-yard field goal from kicker Matt Stover. However, the Jets responded with quarterback Mark Sanchez completing an 80-yard touchdown pass to wide receiver Braylon Edwards. The Colts would come right back with Stover's 19-yard field goal, but New York answered with Sanchez's nine-yard touchdown pass to tight end Dustin Keller, followed by kicker Jay Feely making a 48-yard field goal. Fortunately, Indianapolis would strike back as quarterback Peyton Manning found rookie wide receiver Austin Collie on a 16-yard touchdown pass.

The Colts would take the lead in the third quarter with Manning hooking up with wide receiver Pierre Garçon on a four-yard touchdown pass. Indianapolis would add onto their lead in the fourth quarter as Manning hooked up with tight end Dallas Clark on a 15-yard touchdown pass, followed by Stover's 21-yard field goal.

With the win, not only did the Colts improve their overall record to 16–2, but they would advance to their second Super Bowl in four years.

The game served as Peyton Manning's last playoff win as a Colt and the team's last playoff win until their comeback win at home against the Kansas City Chiefs in the Wildcard Round of the 2013 playoffs. This would serve as the team's last appearance in the AFC Championship Game until the 2014 playoffs. Manning would win his next playoff game in the Divisional Round of the 2013 playoffs as a member of the Broncos.

Super Bowl XLIV vs. New Orleans Saints

After the coin toss, the Saints wanted the ball first; however, this didn't help their first drive. The Colts drove the ball down the field with an attempt to score the first touchdown but was denied and forced Matt Stover to kick a 38-yard goal. But the Colts were not finished: on their next possession, Pierre Garçon caught a 19-yard TD pass from Peyton Manning, and the Colts led 10–0 after fifteen minutes. In the second quarter, the Saints were forced to look upon Garrett Hartley for two field goals – a 46 yarder and a 44 yarder respectively – and the deficit was reduced to four points by halftime.

Kicking off the second half, the Saints caught Indy by surprise with the "Ambush" play (an onside kick in kickoff formation), which the Saints recovered, shifting the momentum to them. Pierre Thomas caught a 16-yard screen pass from Drew Brees and NO had their first lead of the game, 13–10 after the extra point. The Colts would not be denied from scoring again with the rushing attack of Joseph Addai, capping off the scoring drive with a 4-yard run. From here, however, the Colts would be denied. The Saints still stood by Hartley to keep the game close with a 47-yard field goal, taking the score to 17–16. In the fourth quarter, Jeremy Shockey caught a two-yard touchdown pass from Drew Brees with Lance Moore catching a two-point conversion and the Saints led 24–17. In the end, it was the defense that came through when Tracy Porter intercepted and returned 74 yards for a touchdown to seal the win and the first Super Bowl title for the New Orleans Saints in their 44-year existence.

Awards and honors

Note: Since the 2010 Pro Bowl was held before Super Bowl XLIV, the seven players selected did not participate.

Scores by quarter

Criticism
In week 16, the Indianapolis Colts faced off against the New York Jets with an undefeated record of 14–0, having already clinched home–field advantage throughout the playoffs. In the third quarter with a 15–10 lead, head coach Jim Caldwell benched Peyton Manning for Curtis Painter. The Jets forced Painter to fumble, then recovered it for a touchdown and turned into an 18–15 lead. Indianapolis never recovered, never put Manning into the game, and lost 29–15, ending the Colts' chance at an undefeated season. Manning's reaction was, "Until any player in here is the head coach, you follow orders and you follow them with all of your heart." On fans' reaction to the game, Jeff Saturday stated,  "I don't blame them a bit, man.. I probably would have booed, too. I don't blame them. They pay to come see us win games, and we didn't get it done."

References

External links
2009 Indianapolis Colts season at Pro-Football Reference
2009 Indianapolis Colts season at ESPN

Indianapolis
AFC South championship seasons
American Football Conference championship seasons
Indianapolis Colts seasons
Colts